General elections were held in the Netherlands on 28 April 1971. The Labour Party (PvdA) emerged as the largest party, winning 39 of the 150 seats in the House of Representatives. The elections were the first without compulsory voting, causing a sharp fall in voter turnout, down to 79.1% from 94.9% in the 1967 elections. Barend Biesheuvel of the Anti-Revolutionary Party (ARP) became Prime Minister, leading the first Biesheuvel cabinet.

His cabinet contained a broad coalition of parties, with ministers from ARP, Christian Historical Union (both Protestant), the Catholic People's Party, the conservative-liberal People's Party for Freedom and Democracy and moderate socialist Democratic Socialists '70 (DS'70), which had just split off from the PvdA.

However, Biesheuvel's government was short-lived; following a decision to cut government spending, DS'70 withdrew from the government, causing it to lose its majority and fresh elections to be held after just a year and seven months.

Results

References

General elections in the Netherlands
1971 elections in the Netherlands
Netherlands
April 1971 events in Europe